MCP1 may refer to:
 Monocyte chemoattractant protein 1, cytokine also known as CCL2
 Mast cell protease 1, enzyme also known as chymase

See also 
 MCP (disambiguation)